Excellent Walaza (born 8 April 1987) is a South African former soccer player who played as a striker. He played club football for Orlando Pirates, SuperSport United, Bloemfontein Celtic, Vasco da Gama and Atlie and international football for South Africa.

External links
 

1987 births
South African soccer players
Living people
Orlando Pirates F.C. players
Association football forwards
Sportspeople from Soweto
SuperSport United F.C. players
South Africa international soccer players
2008 Africa Cup of Nations players
Bloemfontein Celtic F.C. players
Vasco da Gama (South Africa) players
Atlie F.C. players